Clash of the Cover Bands is an American music competition television series which airs on E!. The show has Stephen "tWitch" Boss as host, plus Meghan Trainor, Adam Lambert and Ester Dean as judges. The show is produced by Jimmy Fallon.

The show
Each episode has two bands of similar musical genre, competing against each other in two rounds. The band with the most entertaining cover performance is declared the winner. The prize money is $10,000 and the winner gets a chance to perform on The Tonight Show Starring Jimmy Fallon.

References

External links
On NBC
 
 At Rotten Tomatoes

Jimmy Fallon
Music competitions in the United States
Reality music competition television series